The Gaumee Film Award for Best Makeup is given as part of the Gaumee Film Awards for Maldivian Films.

The award was first given in 1994. Here is a list of the award winners and the nominees of the respective award ceremonies.

Winners and nominees

See also
 Gaumee Film Awards

References

Gaumee Film Awards
Film awards for makeup and hairstyling